Liran Einav (born November 1970 in Tel Aviv) is an American–Israeli economist and currently professor of economics at Stanford University. His research focuses on industrial organization, health and regulation.

Early life and education 
From 1988 to 1996, Einav served as a captain in the intelligence unit of the Israeli Defense Forces.

Following military service, he enrolled at Tel Aviv University and graduated with a BA in computer science and economics in 1997. He went on to further study at Harvard University and received his Ph.D. in economics in 2002.

Academic career 
After graduating from Harvard University, Einav's first academic position was as an assistant professor at Stanford University. He was granted tenure and promoted to associate professor in 2007 and full professor in 2012.

He has served in an editorial capacity for various academic journals such as The American Economic Review, Econometrica and American Economic Journals: Applied Economics.

He was elected fellow of the Econometric Society and the American Academy of Arts and Sciences in 2012 and 2015, respectively.

Selected works

References

External links 
 Profile on the website of Stanford University
 Profile on the website of NBER

Living people
1970 births
Tel Aviv University alumni
People from Tel Aviv
Harvard Graduate School of Arts and Sciences alumni
Stanford University alumni
Fellows of the Econometric Society
Fellows of the American Academy of Arts and Sciences
Israeli economists
American economists
Health economists